Sharone Addaryl Wright (born January 30, 1973) is an American former professional basketball player.

Born in Macon, Georgia, he played collegiately at Clemson University from 1991 until 1994.

Wright was selected 6th overall in the 1994 NBA draft by the Philadelphia 76ers. He played four NBA seasons with the 76ers and Toronto Raptors. His best year as a professional came during his rookie season with the 76ers when he appeared in 79 games and averaged 11.4 points and 6 rebounds per game. He was named to the NBA All-Rookie Second Team.

While still a member of the Raptors, Wright's NBA career was cut short by a car accident in Macon, Georgia in which he suffered multiple injuries, including broken arms and collarbone.  In 203 career games, he averaged 9.7 points (from .456 FG and .618 FT), 5.0 rebounds and 1.6 blocks in 22.3 minutes per game.

He also played professionally in Spain, Poland, South Korea as well as in the Netherlands with the EiffelTowers, where he won the Dutch title as a player and also the Dutch cup. He also won the game against Real Madrid    

Wright later became a coach for HOOP-CAMPS in Europe.

Coaching career

Wright currently coaches in South Carolina with the private coaching service, CoachUp.

Notes

External links
Sharone Wright NBA statistics at basketballreference.com
Sharone Wright is a guest on The NBA Breakdown in September 2008 (audio)
Sharone Wright takes part in a Toronto Raptors reunion show on The NBA Breakdown in December 2008 (audio)
 Wright gives an exclusive interview for Dutch fansite.
HOOP-CAMPS basketball camp with Sharone Wright

1973 births
Living people
21st-century African-American sportspeople
African-American basketball players
American expatriate basketball people in Canada
American expatriate basketball people in Hong Kong
American expatriate basketball people in the Netherlands
American expatriate basketball people in Poland
American expatriate basketball people in South Korea
American expatriate basketball people in Spain
American men's basketball players
Basketball players from Georgia (U.S. state)
CB Valladolid players
Centers (basketball)
Clemson Tigers men's basketball players
Heroes Den Bosch players
Greek Basket League players
Jeonju KCC Egis players
KK Włocławek players
Liga ACB players
McDonald's High School All-Americans
Parade High School All-Americans (boys' basketball)
Philadelphia 76ers draft picks
Philadelphia 76ers players
Power forwards (basketball)
Sportspeople from Macon, Georgia
Toronto Raptors players
Universiade gold medalists for the United States
Universiade medalists in basketball
Yakama Sun Kings players
20th-century African-American sportspeople